HD 72108 (A Vel, A Velorum) is a star system in the constellation Vela.  It is approximately 1640 light years from Earth.

The primary component, HD 72108 A, is a blue-white B-type subgiant with an apparent magnitude of +5.33.  It is a spectroscopic binary, whose components are separated by 0.176 arcseconds. At a distance of 4 arcseconds away is the third component, the magnitude +7.7 HD 72108 B.  The fourth component, HD 72108 C has an apparent magnitude of +9.3, and is 19 arcseconds from the primary.

References

Velorum, A
072108
B-type subgiants
4
Spectroscopic binaries
Vela (constellation)
3358
041616
CD-47 04004